AZ Phoenicis (HR 239) is a variable star in the constellation of Phoenix. It has an average visual apparent magnitude of 6.47, so it is at the limit of naked eye visibility. Its absolute magnitude is calculated at 1.65.

AZ Phoenicis is a Delta Scuti variable that pulsates with a single period of 79.3 minutes, causing its visual brightness to vary with an amplitude of 0.015 magnitudes. Its variability was discovered by Werner Weiss in 1977, from observations with the 50-cm telescope at La Silla Observatory. AZ Phoenicis has also been classified as a possible Ap star, which remains uncertain, even though the star has a large concentration of metals; the overall metallicity of the star has been measured to about 3 times the solar metallicity.

This star is classified with a spectral type of A9/F0III, corresponding to a giant of type A or F. With an estimated radius of 2.7 times the solar radius, it is shining with 19 times the solar luminosity at an effective temperature of 7,280 K. The astrometric observations by the Hipparcos spacecraft detected a significant acceleration in the proper motion of AZ Phoenicis, indicating it is an astrometric binary.

References

Delta Scuti variables
Phoenix (constellation)
A-type giants
F-type giants
Astrometric binaries
Durchmusterung objects
004849
003903
0239
Phoenicix, AZ